Bab el-Gasus, also known as the Priestly Cache and the Second Cache, was a cache of ancient 21st dynasty (c. 1070–945 BCE) Egyptian mummies found at Deir el-Bahari in 1891. It was excavated by French Egyptologists Eugène Grebaut and Georges Daressy, with Urbain Bouriant and Ahmed Kamal, on the direction of Mohamed Ahmed Abd al‑Rassul, who had also revealed the location of the Royal Cache in 1881. The tomb entrance was located on the flat area just outside the precinct wall in front of the Mortuary Temple of Hatshepsut. The find was significant for Egyptology, particularly in respect of religion, mummification, and coffin studies. It is the largest intact tomb ever found in Egypt. Today, the contents of the tomb are spread between 30 museums worldwide.

In 1893, Khedive Abbas II of Egypt presented groups of artefacts from the tomb to 16 countries, as gifts celebrating the Khedive's accession to the throne. As a result of this dispersion, the artefacts have received limited focus by scholars.

It contained 254 richly decorated coffins (101 double sets) giving 153 coffin sets in total, as well as 110 shabti boxes, 77 Osirian wooden statuettes (mostly hollow and containing a papyrus), 8 wooden steles, 2 large wooden statues (Isis and Nephthys), 16 canopic reed baskets, 5 round baskets made of woven reed. The coffins were made almost exclusively with wood from the native fig tree, the Ficus sycomorus.

On the 125th anniversary of the find, the Centro de Estudos Clássicos e Humanísticos of the University of Coimbra launched the "Gate of the Priests" project, with the University of Leiden, the National Museum of Antiquities of Leiden, the Vatican Museums and UCLA, in order to reconstruct the original collection of Bab el-Gasus.

A new display of the Bab el-Gasus artefacts was opened at the Egyptian Museum in Cairo in 2021 following the moving of the Royal Cache.

Although one of the Theban tombs, the tomb never received a serial number.

International donations
In 1907 Daressy published a list of the 71 coffins sets that were donated overseas in 1893 by Khedive Abbas:

Anonymous coffins 75 and 126 were sent to the Museum of Alexandria.

Burials
Burials in the tomb include the following, amongst others:
 Children of Menkheperre
 Children of Pinedjem II
 Gautseshen
 Tjanefer

List of objects found
A list of the objects found was published by Daressy in 1900:
 153 coffin sets, of which 101 include two coffins and 52 a single coffin
 110 ushebti-boxes
 77 wooden statuettes of Osiris, most of them hollowed and holding a papyrus scroll 
 8 wooden stelae
 2 large wooden statuettes of Isis and Nephthys
 16 canopic vases
 1 mat
 10 baskets of reeds
 5 round baskets
 2 fans
 5 pairs of sandals
 11 baskets with food (with meat, fruits, etc.)
 6 baskets with floral garlands
 5 large vases
 5 pots
 1 box with wooden hands and divine beards ripped from coffins

Gallery

Initial discovery

Display at Egyptian Museum, Cairo

References

Citations

Sources

Further reading

 Daressy, George, Les Cercueils des Prètres D'Ammon (Deuxime Trouvaille de Deir el-Bahari), 1907
 The Gate of the Priests. Bab el-Gasus project: Funeral pragmatics of the ancient egyptian (religious) elite in the Third Intermediate Period, 2014
 Hülya Ataşcıoğlu Aykul, M. Baha Tanman et Miguel Ángel Escobar-Clarós, « A Note on the Turkish Lot III/1891 From the Bab el-Gasus Cache (Egypt), Kept at the Istanbul Archaeology Museums / Ancient Orient Museum », Anatolia Antiqua [En ligne], XXVII | 2019, mis en ligne le 31 janvier 2022, consulté le 16 avril 2022. URL : http://journals.openedition.org/anatoliaantiqua/1026 ; DOI : https://doi.org/10.4000/anatoliaantiqua.1026
 de Sousa, R. (Eds.). (16 Oct. 2018). The Tomb of the Priests of Amun. Leiden, The Netherlands: Brill. doi: https://doi.org/10.1163/9789004386501
 Dautant (2016) Collective tombs discovered in the Theban necropolis in 1820 in Bab el-Gasus in context Egyptian funerary culture during the 21st dynasty (19-20 September 2016, Lisbon)

Theban tombs
1891 archaeological discoveries